Triaenophora is a genus of flowering plants native to Temperate Asia. Its family placement is not fully settled, : it may be placed in Orobanchaceae or Plantaginaceae.

Taxonomy
The genus Triaenophora was first erected by Hans Solereder in 1909, based on a section of the genus Rehmannia which Joseph Dalton Hooker had called "Trianophora" in 1891. It was initially placed in the family Scrophulariaceae. When that family was shown by molecular phylogenetic studies not to be monophyletic, and so was split up, Triaenophora was placed in Plantaginaceae, a placement still used by Plants of the World Online . Subsequent studies have shown that Triaenophora forms a clade with Rehmannia, basal to parasitic genera in the family Orobanchaceae. While a 2009 study left Triaenophora unplaced as to family, a 2019 study placed it in a more broadly circumscribed Orobanchaceae:

Species
, Plants of the World Online accepted four species:
 Triaenophora bucharica B.Fedtsch. 
 Triaenophora integra (H.L.Li) Ivanina 
 Triaenophora rupestris (Hemsl.) Soler. 
 Triaenophora shennongjiaensis Xi.D.Li, Y.Y.Zan & J.Q.Li

References

Lamiales
Lamiales genera